was a Japanese feudal domain under the Tokugawa shogunate of Edo period Japan, located in Mikawa Province located in eastern Mikawa Province (modern-day eastern Aichi Prefecture), Japan. It was centered on Yoshida Castle in what is now the city of Toyohashi, Aichi. It was ruled by a number of different fudai daimyō over the course of the Edo period, before finally passing into the hands of the Matsudaira (Ōkōchi) clan.

History
Following the Battle of Odawara in 1590, Toyotomi Hideyoshi transferred Tokugawa Ieyasu to the Kantō region, and gave a portion of his former territories in eastern Mikawa to Ikeda Terumasa.  Terumasa developed the castle town around Yoshida Castle and embarked on a massive and ambitious expansion plan for the castle itself. However, following the Battle of Sekigahara, he was reassigned to Himeji Castle, and left Yoshida even before a central donjon had been completed.

Following the creation of the Tokugawa shogunate, Yoshida became center of Yoshida Domain. The holding was considered strategic due to its location. It was a post station on the Tōkaidō connecting Edo and Kyoto. It was also an ocean port and river port.

After the establishment of the Tokugawa shogunate, Yoshida Castle became the center of Yoshida Domain, a feudal domain, which occupied a strategic position on the Tōkaidō between Edo and Nagoya. The domain was assigned to several different fudai daimyō clans until coming into the possession of the Matsudaira (Nagasawa-Ōkōchi) clan in 1752, which remained in residence at Yoshida until the Meiji Restoration. 
 
The final daimyō of Yoshida, Matsudaira Nobuhisa, held a number of important posts in the Bakumatsu period government. With the Boshin War, the samurai of the domain were deeply divided over which side to support. However, with the fall of Nagoya Domain to pro-Imperial forces in February 1868, he surrendered the castle without resistance to the Meiji government in March 1868. Due to possible confusion with Iyo-Yoshida Domain, the name of the domain was changed to “Toyohashi Domain” in June 1869.

After the end of the conflict, with the abolition of the han system in July 1871, Toyohashi Domain became “Toyohashi Prefecture”, which merged with the short lived Nukata Prefecture in November 1871, which later became part of Aichi Prefecture.

The domain had a population of 76,228 people in 17,517 households per an 1869 census.

Holdings at the end of the Edo period
As with most domains in the han system, Yoshida Domain consisted of several discontinuous territories calculated to provide the assigned kokudaka, based on periodic cadastral surveys and projected agricultural yields. 
Mikawa Province 
5 villages in Nukata District
47 villages in Kamo District
54 villages in Hoi District
67 villages in Atsumi District
48 villages in Yana District
Tōtōmi Province
3 villages in Kitō District
19 villages in Fuchi District
Omi Province
20 villages in Asai District
2 villages in Ika District
1 village in Takashima District

List of daimyō

References

External links
  Yoshida on "Edo 300 HTML"

Notes

Domains of Japan
1600 establishments in Japan
States and territories established in 1600
1871 disestablishments in Japan
States and territories disestablished in 1871
Mikawa Province
Domains of Aichi Prefecture
Fukōzu-Matsudaira clan
Kuze clan
Makino clan
Matsudaira clan
Mizuno clan
Ogasawara clan
Ōkōchi-Matsudaira clan